Pocket Dragons are collectible depictions of friendly dragons in various situations.  They are produced primarily in figurine form, but also are released as ornaments, in flat artwork and various other forms.   They were created by, and are still designed by, Real Musgrave, and the figurines are manufactured by Collectible World Studios.  Unlike many artists behind collectible lines, Musgrave not only creates the flat artwork for them, but also sculpts them.  Both Real and his wife, Muff, have enjoyed nearly complete creative control over the line.

History

The story of the Pocket Dragon goes back to a limited set of black and white drawings done by Real Musgrave in the mid-1970s, depicting a small dragon in the pocket of a tweed sport jacket. Those dragons were originally based on Real and Muff's dog Flower.

The first set of Pocket Dragon figurines went on sale in June 1989, and included twenty-seven of the figures.  They were produced in Stoke-on-Trent, England.

In 1998, an animated television series was produced based on Pocket Dragons, called Pocket Dragon Adventures. It ran for fifty-two half hour episodes or 104 European 15 minute episodes. The writers of the series collaborated with both Musgraves, and Real contributed designs for virtually every episode.

As of 2006, over 400 different Pocket Dragons figures had been released, as well as games, books and hundreds of other products.

Real and Muff Musgrave announced their retirement in the fall of 2005, along with the Pocket Dragon figurine collection, to be effective on December 31, 2006.

In May 2006 the distributor Collectible World Studios went into receivership due to high debts and ceased trading. The production and distribution of what would be the last Pocket Dragon pieces was uncertain. Since then the official website and the website of the distributor are no longer online. Xystos, a company linked with the Collectables (Fine Glass and China) LTD company bought CWS later in 2006.

On November 12, 2006, what was probably the last ever UK Pocket Dragons event was held at Collectables (Fine Glass and China) LTD, Stockton on Tees. Real and Muff Musgrave had retired and were attending to abandoned animals, but Real still produced Pocket Dragon products licensed with other companies. The proceeds from sales benefit animal charities with which the Musgraves worked. In 2011 they continued their collaborations with Precious Gifts in Maryland to produce a special limited edition figurine to benefit the Humane Society of Flower Mound (in Texas).

Unlike many artists involved in collectibles and television, Real Musgrave has always personally owned the trademarks and copyrights for his work. The Pocket Dragon trademarks and copyrights are active.

External links
 None currently available.

Products introduced in 1989